Jonesy may refer to:

People
Brendan Jones (radio personality) (born 1968), Australian radio host
Steve Jones (musician), Sex Pistols guitarist and radio host
John Paul Jones (musician) (born 1946), member of the band Led Zeppelin
Justin Roderick Jones (born 1983), Australian explorer, member of duo Cas and Jonesy
Jesper Kyd (born 1972), Danish video game composer

Characters
Jonesy, a character in the HBO series Carnivàle
Jonesy, a character in the Crave show Letterkenny
Evan 'Jonesy' Jones, a character in the Australian police drama series Blue Heelers
Gary Ambrose 'Jonesy' Jones of the Stephen King book Dreamcatcher
the same character in the eponymous film Dreamcatcher
Jonesy Hecht, a character in the musical film All That Jazz
Jonesy Garcia, a character in the Canadian animated sitcom 6teen
Officer Jones (nicknamed Jonesy), a character in The Flash TV series
Jonesy, the ship's cat of the USS Nostromo in the film Alien
Agent John 'Jonesy' Jones, a character in the game Fortnite Battle Royale.
Sonar Technician 1st Class Ronald "Jonesy" Jones, USN, a character in the film The Hunt for Red October

See also
Jones (disambiguation)